The , officially the , is a funicular line in Kannami, Shizuoka Prefecture, Japan operated by the Izuhakone Railway.

The line was opened on October 16, 1956 by the Sunzu Railway Company, which was acquired by the Izuhakone Railway in 1957. The line climbs Jukkoku Pass, literally meaning "ten countries pass", as it is claimed that ten "countries" (old provinces of Japan) can be seen from the summit of the pass. The line runs on average every eight minutes, with travel time in each direction at 3 minutes. The cars on the line are painted in the colors of the Seibu Lions baseball team, which is owned by Izuhakone Railway's parent company, Seibu.

Basic data
Distance: 
Gauge:  (in contrast to the narrow gauge of most Japanese railways including funiculars.)
Stations: 2
Vertical interval: .

View from Jukkokutōge station

See also
Hakone Komagatake Ropeway
List of funicular railways

External links 
 

Funicular railways in Japan
Rail transport in Shizuoka Prefecture
Tourist attractions in Shizuoka Prefecture
Izuhakone Railway
Standard gauge railways in Japan
Railway lines opened in 1956
1956 establishments in Japan